Pleasant Township is one of twenty-six townships in Fulton County, Illinois, USA.  As of the 2010 census, its population was 744 and it contained 387 housing units.

Geography

Cities, towns, villages
 Ipava

Unincorporated towns
 Howard
(This list is based on USGS data and may include former settlements.)

Cemeteries
The township contains these seven cemeteries: Danner, Howard, Ipava, Lacey, Montgomery, Old Ipava and Smith.

Major highways
  U.S. Route 24
  U.S. Route 136

Demographics

School districts
 Astoria Community Unit School District 1
 V I T Community Unit School District 2

Political districts
 Illinois's 17th congressional district
 State House District 94
 State Senate District 47

References
 
 United States Census Bureau 2007 TIGER/Line Shapefiles
 United States National Atlas

External links
 City-Data.com
 Illinois State Archives

Townships in Fulton County, Illinois
Townships in Illinois